John Richardson (b North Bierley 6 February 1676; d York 28 October 1735) was Archdeacon of Cleveland from 3 August 1711 to his death on 28 October 1735.
 
Richardson was educated at Christ's College, Cambridge. He held livings at Burton Agnes and Beeford.

References

1735 deaths
1676 births
Clergy from Yorkshire
Alumni of Christ's College, Cambridge
17th-century English Anglican priests
18th-century English Anglican priests
Archdeacons of Cleveland